In Greek mythology, the Oenotropae ("the women who change (into) wine") or Oenotrophae (the "Winegrowers") were the three daughters of Anius and Dryope.

Names 
The Oenotropae included: Spermo ("seed"), who produced grain; Oeno or Oino ("wine"), who produced wine; and Elais ("olive tree"), who produced olive oil.

Mythology 
According to the Bibliotheca, their great-grandfather was Dionysus, and he gave them the power to change water into wine, grass into wheat, and berries into olives. For this reason no one around them ever had to starve. According to other sources, however, the daughters were devotees of Dionysus, and the god rewarded them with the extraordinary ability to produce oil, grain, and wine from the ground or merely by touch.

When the Greek fleet set out to make war in Troy, it was the Oenotropae who stocked their ships, and Agamemnon was so impressed with this that he abducted them in order to feed the Greek army. The daughters escaped, but their brother betrayed them again to the Greeks. As they were about to be bound, however, Dionysus saved them by turning them into white doves.

See also
 Dionysus
  for asteroid 13862 Elais

Notes

References 

Maurus Servius Honoratus, In Vergilii carmina comentarii. Servii Grammatici qui feruntur in Vergilii carmina commentarii; recensuerunt Georgius Thilo et Hermannus Hagen. Georgius Thilo. Leipzig. B. G. Teubner. 1881. Online version at the Perseus Digital Library.
Pseudo-Apollodorus, The Library with an English Translation by Sir James George Frazer, F.B.A., F.R.S. in 2 Volumes, Cambridge, MA, Harvard University Press; London, William Heinemann Ltd. 1921. Online version at the Perseus Digital Library. Greek text available from the same website.
Publius Ovidius Naso, Metamorphoses translated by Brookes More (1859-1942). Boston, Cornhill Publishing Co. 1922. Online version at the Perseus Digital Library.
Publius Ovidius Naso, Metamorphoses. Hugo Magnus. Gotha (Germany). Friedr. Andr. Perthes. 1892. Latin text available at the Perseus Digital Library.

Agricultural goddesses
Greek goddesses
Metamorphoses into birds in Greek mythology